Salinimicrobium catena is a Gram-negative, aerobic, heterotrophic and non-motile bacterium from the genus of Salinimicrobium which has been isolated from sediments oft the South China Sea.

References

Flavobacteria
Bacteria described in 2007